Destiny is a 1919 American silent film based on Charles Neville Buck's 1916 novel of the same name. The film was directed by Rollin S. Sturgeon and starred Dorothy Phillips. The film was produced and released by the Jewel Productions brand of the Universal Film Manufacturing Company. The scenario of the film was by Elliott J. Clawson.

The film has an entry in the Library of Congress, along with being listed as a lost film. The six reel film adaptation was described as a rural and society drama.

Kinematograph Weekly wrote that "The fairy-book idea is certainly very intriguing, and has enabled the scenario writer to achieve a much-desired happy ending."

A Destiny song was released in 1919 with lyrics by Alfred Bryan and music by Herbert Spencer. The rights to the song were acquired by Jerome H. Remick & Co.

Charles Neville Buck's novel was illustrated by R. F. Schabelitz, published by Grosset & Dunlap, and copyrighted by W. J. Watt & Company.

Cast 

 Dorothy Phillips
 William Stowell
 Stanhope Wheatcroft

Gallery

References

External links

1919 films
Films directed by Rollin S. Sturgeon
American fantasy films
Universal Pictures films
Lost American films
1919 lost films
Films based on American novels
1910s fantasy films
American silent feature films
American black-and-white films
1910s American films